Without Saying Goodbye is a 2022 Peruvian-Spanish romantic comedy film written and directed by Bruno Ascenzo and starring Maxi Iglesias, Stephanie Cayo and Jely Reategui.

Cast
 Maxi Iglesias as Salvador Campodónico
 Stephanie Cayo as Ariana
 Jely Reategui
 Ahmed Shawky Shaheen
 Vicente Vergara
 Renata Flores
 Muki Sabogal
 Mayella Lloclla
 Rodrigo Palacios
 Wendy Ramos
 Anai Padilla
 Amiel Cayo
 Carlos Carlín
 Alberik García

References

External links
 
 
 

2022 films
2022 romantic comedy films
Peruvian romantic comedy films
Spanish romantic comedy films
Tondero Producciones films
2020s Peruvian films
2020s Spanish films
2020s Spanish-language films
Films set in Peru
Films shot in Peru
Spanish-language Netflix original films